HMS Queen was a 110-gun first-rate ship of the line of the Royal Navy, launched on 15 May 1839 at Portsmouth. She was the last purely sailing built battleship to be ordered. Subsequent ones were ordered with both sails and steam engines. All British battleships were constructed with sailing rig until the 1870s. HMS Queen had an auxiliary steam engine fitted in late 1850s. She was broken up in 1871.

Ordered
She was ordered in 1827 under the name Royal Frederick, but renamed on 12 April 1839 while still on the stocks in honour of the recently enthroned Queen Victoria. She was originally ordered as the final ship of the broadened Caledonia class, but on 3 September 1833 she was re-ordered to a new design by Sir William Symonds.

Of the remaining two intended sister ships, both ordered from Pembroke Dockyard on 3 October 1833,  was eventually completed as a 90-gun screw battleship, while Victoria was eventually completed as a 90-gun screw battleship under the name .

In 1842 she was visited by Queen Victoria.

Crimean War
Queen was engaged in the Bombardment of Sevastopol on 17 October 1854 during the Crimean War under Captain Frederick Thomas Michell. She was set on fire three times and eventually forced to withdraw from the action. The famous Timothy the tortoise, who was about 160 years old when she died in 2004, was the ship's mascot during this time.

Refitted
Between August 1858 and April 1859 Queen had an auxiliary steam engine fitted, and at the same time was cut down from three decks to two gundecks, and re-armed as an 86-gun ship. She was fitted with a Maudslay, Sons and Field 500 nhp engine and single screw propulsion.

Broken up
The ship was broken up in 1871 at Surrey Canal Wharf in Rotherhithe, on the River Thames.

Notes

References

Duckers, Peter (2011) The Crimean War at Sea: The Naval Campaigns against Russia, 1854-56. Pen & Sword Maritime. .
Lavery, Brian (2003) The Ship of the Line – Volume 1: The development of the battlefleet 1650–1850. Conway Maritime Press. .
Lyon, David and Winfield, Rif (2004) The Sail and Steam Navy List, 1815–1889. Chatham Publishing. .
Bonhams, Lot notes for the painting of HMS Queen leaving Malta, by Robert Strickland Thomas.

External links

Ships of the line of the Royal Navy
Ships built in Portsmouth
1839 ships
Crimean War naval ships of the United Kingdom